Sheneta Shanata Grimmond (born 9 August 1998) is a Guyanese cricketer who plays for Guyana, Trinbago Knight Riders and the West Indies. She plays primarily as a right-arm off break bowler. In August 2019, she was named in the West Indies squad for their series against Australia. She made her Women's One Day International (WODI) debut for the West Indies against Australia on 8 September 2019. She made her Women's Twenty20 International (WT20I) debut for the West Indies, also against Australia, on 14 September 2019. In January 2020, she was named in West Indies' squad for the 2020 ICC Women's T20 World Cup in Australia. In May 2021, Grimmond was awarded with a central contract from Cricket West Indies.

In June 2021, Grimmond was named in the West Indies A Team for their series against Pakistan. In October 2021, she was named in the West Indies team for the 2021 Women's Cricket World Cup Qualifier tournament in Zimbabwe.

References

External links

1998 births
Living people
Guyanese women cricketers
West Indian women cricketers
West Indies women One Day International cricketers
West Indies women Twenty20 International cricketers
Trinbago Knight Riders (WCPL) cricketers